Maddenahalli is a village in the southern state of Karnataka, India. It is located in the Nelamangala taluk of Bangalore Rural district.

Demographics 
Maddenahalli had population of 381 of which 190 are males while 191 are females as per report released by Census India 2011.

Geography 
The total geographical area of village is 135.59 hectares.

Bus Route from Bengaluru City 
Yeshwantapura  - Nelamangala

See also 

 Nidavanda
 Bengaluru Rural District

References

External links 

Villages in Bangalore Rural district